Sandiacre is a civil parish in the Borough of Erewash in Derbyshire, England. The parish contains ten listed buildings that are recorded in the National Heritage List for England.  Of these, one is listed at Grade I, the highest of the three grades, and the others are at Grade II, the lowest grade.  The parish contains the village of Sandiacre and the surrounding area.  The listed buildings consist of a church, a village lock-up and pound, two bridges crossing the Erewash  Canal, a house, a milepost, a former lace factory and its office block, and two pairs of almshouses.


Key

Buildings

References

Citations

Sources

 

Lists of listed buildings in Derbyshire